Paint Township is one of the seventeen townships of Highland County, Ohio, United States. As of the 2010 census the population was 4,585, up from 4,112 at the 2000 census.

Geography
Located in the east part of the county, it borders the following townships:
Madison Township - north
Paint Township, Ross County - northeast
Paxton Township, Ross County - east
Perry Township, Pike County - southeast
Brushcreek Township - south, east of Marshall Township
Marshall Township - south, west of Brushcreek Township
Liberty Township - southwest
Penn Township - west
Fairfield Township - northwest

No municipalities are located in Paint Township. The unincorporated community of Rainsboro is along US-50 in the township.

Major highways

Name and history
Paint Township takes its name from Paint Creek. It is one of six Paint Townships statewide.

Government
The township is governed by a three-member board of trustees, who are elected in November of odd-numbered years to a four-year term beginning on the following January 1. Two are elected in the year after the presidential election and one is elected in the year before it. There is also an elected township fiscal officer, who serves a four-year term beginning on April 1 of the year after the election, which is held in November of the year before the presidential election. Vacancies in the fiscal officership or on the board of trustees are filled by the remaining trustees.

References

External links
County website

Townships in Highland County, Ohio
Townships in Ohio